Notarztwagen 7 is a 1976–1977 German medical drama television series directed by Helmut Ashley. It is regarded as a cult television series in Germany. Thirteen 25 minute episodes were produced for ARD and it aired from 1 December 1976. Notarztwagen means "Emergency Doctor Vehicle". The series portrays the contemporary life of a rescue team, emergency physician and paramedics. It is filmed in and around Frankfurt as well as occasionally in Wiesbaden and set at BG Trauma Clinic Frankfurt am Main. The screenplay was written by Bruno Hampel. The theme tune was composed by Peter Thomas.

Cast
Joachim Bliese: Dr. Brandenberg
Rainer Basedow
Emily Reuer: Dr. Barbara Kersten
Kornelia Boje
Thomas Braut
Herbert Guenter
Klaus Havenstein
Manfred Heidmann
Sascha Hehn
Horst Keller
Eva Pflug
Marlies Schoenau
Erwin Schwab
Andreas Seyferth
Helga Sloop: Disponentin Fa. Pol Eis
Paul Sobania
Guenther Tabor

Episodes

 Bestimmungsort Frankfurt (1. December 1976)
 Die Gefälligkeit (8. December 1976)
 Später Frühling (15. December 1976)
 801 übernimmt die Fahndung (22. December 1976)
 Die Jubilarin (5. January 1977)
 Die Pleite muss gefeiert werden (12. January 1977)
 Letzter Aufruf für Dr. Reimann  (19. January 1977)
 Bodenloser Leichtsinn  (2. February 1977)
 Die Prüfung (9. February 1977)
 Nur 220 Volt (16. February 1977)
 Selbst ist der Mann (2. March 1977)
 Endstation Kanal (9. March 1977)
 Die große Schau (23. March 1977)

See also
List of German television series

References

External links
 
Video clip

German medical television series
1976 German television series debuts
1977 German television series endings
German-language television shows
Das Erste original programming